Aphaenops delbreili is a species of beetle in the subfamily Trechinae. It was described by Genest in 1983.

References

delbreili
Beetles described in 1983